New York House may refer to:

 New York House, California, a gold-rush town
 New York State Assembly, or New York House of Representatives
 Garage house, a music style